The Whip is a 1928 American silent drama film directed by Charles Brabin and starring Dorothy Mackaill. It was based on a 1912 play The Whip by Cecil Raleigh and Henry Hamilton and distributed by First National. This film was a silent released with a Vitaphone soundtrack of music and effects. It is set in the horse racing world of England.

Cast
Dorothy Mackaill as Lady Diana
Ralph Forbes as Lord Brancaster
Anna Q. Nilsson as Iris d'Aquila
Lowell Sherman as Greville Sartoris
Albert Gran as Sam Kelley
Marc McDermott as Lord Beverly
Louis Payne as Lambert
Arthur Clayton as Richard Haslam
Jack McDonald as Detective (uncredited)

Preservation status
The Whip survives in archives at Cineteca Italiana, Milan, and the UCLA Film and Television Archive.

References

External links

1928 films
American silent feature films
American films based on plays
First National Pictures films
Films directed by Charles Brabin
American black-and-white films
Films set in England
American horse racing films
1928 drama films
Silent American drama films
1920s American films